Kwiatków  is a village in the administrative district of Gmina Otmuchów, within Nysa County, Opole Voivodeship, in south-western Poland, close to the Czech border.

The village has a population of 99, and is the birthplace of Alexander von Falkenhausen, a German military officer in China and Belgium.

People from Kwiatków 
 Alexander von Falkenhausen (1878-1966), German general

References

Villages in Nysa County